Mount Virdin is a mountain 4 nautical miles (7 km) southwest of Mount Hemmingsen in the Werner Mountains, Palmer Land. Mapped by United States Geological Survey (USGS) from surveys and U.S. Navy air photos, 1961–67. Named by Advisory Committee on Antarctic Names (US-ACAN) for Floyd Virdin, construction mechanic at South Pole Station in 1967.

Mountains of Palmer Land